Central American reunification, sometimes called Central Americanism, is the proposed political union of the countries of Central America (Costa Rica, El Salvador, Guatemala, Honduras, and Nicaragua), which had historically occurred during the existence of the Federal Republic of Central America. It is distinct from the Central American integration process, which is a diplomatic initiative similar to that of the European Union.

Currently the civil organization Movimiento Ciudadano para la Integración Centroamericana (Citizen Movement for Central American Integration) founded in 2014 actively seeks Central American reunification, having chapters in El Salvador, Guatemala, Honduras (in addition to some local chapters), Nicaragua, and in the Central American diaspora (Australia, Italy, Spain, and the United States), but not in Costa Rica. These chapters are known as "state councils".

The first politician to come up with this idea was General Augusto César Sandino from Nicaragua, and the first political figure in modern times to propose a unification of Central America, including Panama, is President of El Salvador Nayib Bukele.

History
Attempts to restore the Federal Republic of Central America have existed since its dissolution. One of the best known cases was when the liberal Guatemalan President Justo Rufino Barrios, with the support of Honduras and the United States, tried to re-establish the Central American Federation in the so-called Intentona de Barrios, but that ended with his death in the Battle of Chalchuapa.

During the 20th century, it was mainly leftist forces that would propose the reunification of Central America into a single political unit. In 1925, the Central American Socialist Party was founded in Guatemala by Farabundo Martí and other Salvadorans in exile, and would later also operate as the Central American Communist Party. In the 1970s, the Central American Workers' Revolutionary Party, particularly active in El Salvador and Honduras, would emerge.

On September 12, 1946, a meeting of heads of state took place in Santa Ana, El Salvador, where the Santa Ana Agreement between El Salvador and Guatemala was signed. The two countries agreed to study the conditions that will allow the political unity of Central America through a Commission composed of three persons appointed by each of the governments subscribed to the agreement. The agreement was left open for the accession of Costa Rica, Honduras and Nicaragua. This was ratified by El Salvador on November 19.

Some of the parties that still actively propose Central American reunification are the Movement to Socialism of Honduras, the new Central American Socialist Party and the Workers' Party of Costa Rica.

In recent years, Salvadoran President Nayib Bukele has put forward calls for pursuing a deeper regional integration, eventually resulting in a modern Central American unified nation.

Comparison of component countries

See also
 Reunification of Gran Colombia

References

National unifications
Pan-nationalism
Proposed political unions
Central America